Giuseppe Sommaruga (1867–1917) was an Italian architect of the Liberty style or Art nouveau movement. He was the pupil of Camillo Boito and Luca Beltrami to the Brera Academy in Milan. His monumental architecture exerted some influence on the futurist architect Antonio Sant'Elia.

Some of his works:        
 Grand Hotel Campo de' Fiori in Campo dei Fiori, close to Varese (1909–1912)
 Mausoleo Faccanoni in Sarnico (1907)
 Villa Faccanoni in Sarnico
 Palazzina Salmoiraghi, Milan (destroyed)
 Palazzo Castiglioni (1901–1904) in Milan
 Villa Romeo Faccanoni (1912-1914), now part of Clinica Columbus, in Milan

References

Bibliography 
 VV.AA. Angiolo Mazzoni e l'Architettura Futurista, Supplement of CE.S.A.R. September/December 2008 (Available at )
 Andrea Speziali. Italian Liberty. Una nuova stagione dell'Art Nouveau, Risguardi, Forlì 2015

External links 
 Website to celebrate the centennial of his death

19th-century Italian architects
20th-century Italian architects
Architects from Milan
1867 births
1917 deaths
Brera Academy alumni
Art Nouveau architects